Edward Gifford (c. 1485–1556), of Wicken, Northamptonshire, was an English politician.

He was a Member (MP) of the Parliament of England for Buckingham in October 1553.

References

1485 births
1556 deaths
English MPs 1553 (Mary I)
People from West Northamptonshire District